is a novella by Japanese writer Natsume Sōseki.  Written in eight days in December 1905 and published in the January 1906 issue of the magazine Teikoku Bungaku ("Imperial Literature"), it is a story about the aftermath of the Russo-Japanese War of 1904–5 and reveals Sōseki's attitude to war.

Plot
The novella first recounts the narrator's arrival at a train station where Japanese soldiers are returning from the Russo-Japanese War of 1904–5.  The narrator sees a soldier who bear a striking resemblance to a late friend Kō-san, an infantry lieutenant who was killed in a trench during that war.  He later visits Kō-san's grave at a temple and discovers that a mysterious young woman has also been visiting the bachelor soldier.  Spurred on by curiosity, the narrator visits Kō-san's mother where he finds his friend's diary and reads that Kō-san had met a beautiful young woman at a post office.  After investigations, the narrator proffers his own theory on the heredity of taste – the woman and Kō-san find each other attractive owing to a bond which had previously existed between their ancestors decades ago.

Translations
The Heredity of Taste is available in two translations, both published under the Tuttle imprint.  The first is a 1974 translation by Akito Itō and Graeme Wilson, which also offers two other early works by Sōseki, Ten Nights of Dream and Hearing Things.  The newer version is a standalone 2004 translation by Sammy I. Tsunematsu.

1906 novels
Novels by Natsume Sōseki
Tuttle Publishing books